Mandarivirus is a subgenus of viruses in the order Tymovirales, family Alphaflexiviridae, genus Potexvirus. There are three species in this subgenus. Diseases associated with this subgenus commonly include yellow ringspot and rapid decline of the tree.

Taxonomy
The following species are assigned to the subgenus:
Citrus yellow mottle-associated virus
Citrus yellow vein clearing virus
Indian citrus ringspot virus

Structure
Viruses in Mandarivirus are non-enveloped, with flexuous and filamentous geometries. The diameter is around 13 nm. Genomes are linear, around 7.5kb in length. The genome codes for 6 proteins.

Life cycle
Viral replication is cytoplasmic. Entry into the host cell is achieved by penetration into the host cell. Replication follows the positive stranded RNA virus replication model. Positive stranded RNA virus transcription is the method of transcription. The virus exits the host cell by tripartite non-tubule guided viral movement. Citrus trees serve as the natural host with grafting being a common transmission route.

References

External links
 Viralzone: Mandarivirus
 ICTV

Alphaflexiviridae
Viral citrus diseases
Virus subgenera